Alexis Ronaldo Tibidi (born 3 November 2003) is a French professional footballer who plays as a forward for  club Troyes.

Career
A youth product of the French clubs ESA Brive and Toulouse, Tibidi signed his first professional contract with Stuttgart on 19 July 2021. He made his senior debut with Stuttgart in a 2–1 Bundesliga loss to Borussia Dortmund on 20 November 2021.

On 11 July 2022, Tibidi moved on loan to Rheindorf Altach in Austria for the 2022–23 season.

On 28 January 2023, Tibidi returned to France and signed a contract with Troyes until 30 June 2027.

Personal life
Tibidi is the son of the former Cameroon international footballer, Alexis Tibidi, Sr. He is a practitioner of karate, and was the French national Karate champion in 2017.

References

External links
 
 FFF Profile

2003 births
Living people
Footballers from Lille
French footballers
France youth international footballers
French sportspeople of Cameroonian descent
VfB Stuttgart players
SC Rheindorf Altach players
ES Troyes AC players
Bundesliga players
Austrian Football Bundesliga players
Association football forwards
French expatriate footballers
Expatriate footballers in Germany
French expatriate sportspeople in Germany
Expatriate footballers in Austria
French expatriate sportspeople in Austria